Ait Hammou is a small town and rural commune in masfiwa , Marrakesh-Safi, Morocco. At the time of the 2004 census, the commune had a total population of 7499 people living in 1116 households.

References

Populated places in Rehamna Province
Rural communes of Marrakesh-Safi